Rama  is a Palestinian village in the Jenin Governorate.

History
Rama is an ancient village, situated on a hill in the plain. Ceramics from the Byzantine era have been found here.

Ottoman era
Raba was listed as an entirely Muslim village with a population of 17 families. The inhabitants paid a fixed tax rate of 33,3% on agricultural products, including wheat, barley, summer crops, olive trees, and goats and/or beehives, a press for olive oil or grape syrup, in addition to occasional revenues and a tax on people from the Nablus area, a total of 5,774  akçe.

In 1838 er-Rameh  was noted as a village in the esh-Sharawiyeh esh-Shurkiyeh (the Eastern) district, north of Nablus. 

In 1870 Victor Guérin found the village to have 120 inhabitants. He further noted ancient cisterns. 

In 1882 the PEF's  Survey of Western Palestine  (SWP) noted  Er Rameh as "A conspicuous village on a hilly knoll above the small plain, with a high central house. It is of moderate size, with olives below. The sides of the hill are steep."

British Mandate era
In the  1922 census of Palestine conducted by the British Mandate authorities, Rameh had a population of 149, all Muslim, increasing in the 1931 census to 186, still all Muslim, in 39 houses. 

In the 1945 statistics the population of Er Rama  was 280 Muslims while the total land area was 4,768 dunams, according to an official land and population survey. Of this, 244 dunams were allocated for plantations and irrigable land, 1,487 for cereals, while 6 dunams were classified as built-up areas.

Jordanian era
In the wake of the 1948 Arab–Israeli War and the 1949 Armistice Agreements, Rama came under Jordanian rule.

The Jordanian census of 1961 found 376 inhabitants.

post-1967
Since the Six-Day War in 1967, Rama has been under Israeli occupation.

References

Bibliography

External links
Welcome To al-Rama
Al Rama, Welcome to Palestine
Survey of Western Palestine, Map 11:  IAA, Wikimedia commons

Villages in the West Bank
Jenin Governorate
Municipalities of the State of Palestine